List of Minnesota amphibians lists all of the salamanders, frogs, and toads found in Minnesota.

Salamanders
There are eight species of salamanders in Minnesota.

Frogs
There are eleven species of frogs in Minnesota.

Toads
There are three species of toads in Minnesota.

References

External links
Minnesota Herpetological Society
Checklist of Amphibian Species and Identification Guide
Minnesota Amphibian and Reptile Survey

Minnesota
Amphibians
.Amphibians
.Amphibians